Winnebago is a village in Winnebago County, Illinois. It is part of the Rockford-Winnebago Metropolitan Statistical Area. The population was 3,101 at the 2010 census, up from 2,958 in 2000.

History
James Weber Linn (1876–1939), educator and politician, was born in Winnebago.

Geography
Winnebago is located at  (42.265652, -89.240548).

Demographics

As of the census of 2000, there were 3,000 people, 1,009 households, and 841 families residing in the village. The racial makeup of the village was 98.14% White, 1.12% African American, 0.03% Native American, 0.30% Asian, and 0.41% from two or more races. Hispanic or Latino of any race were 1.18% of the population.

There were 1,009 households, out of which 50.3% had children under the age of 18 living with them, 69.9% were married couples living together, 10.7% had a female householder with no husband present, and 16.6% were non-families. 14.1% of all households were made up of individuals, and 7.2% had someone living alone who was 65 years of age or older. The average household size was 2.93 and the average family size was 3.24.

In the village, the population was spread out, with 34.3% under the age of 18, 5.7% from 18 to 24, 32.6% from 25 to 44, 19.1% from 45 to 64, and 8.3% who were 65 years of age or older. The median age was 34 years. For every 100 females, there were 94.1 males. For every 100 females age 18 and over, there were 90.8 males.

The median income for a household in the village was $59,891, and the median income for a family was $62,685. Males had a median income of $44,851 versus $25,817 for females. The per capita income for the village was $21,019. About 0.9% of families and 1.1% of the population were below the poverty line, including 1.0% of those under age 18 and 3.9% of those age 65 or over.

Education
Students in Winnebago are served by Winnebago CUSD#323. The district has one high school, one middle school and two elementary schools.

References

External links
  Winnebago webpage

Villages in Winnebago County, Illinois
Villages in Illinois
Rockford metropolitan area, Illinois
Populated places established in 1835